The London and North Western Railway (LNWR) Class A was a class of 0-8-0 steam locomotives.  From 1893 to 1900, Crewe Works built 111 of these engines, which had a three-cylinder compound arrangement, and were designed by Francis Webb. According to the LNWR Society, 110 were built between 1894 and 1900.

Rebuilding
Like the other Webb compounds, they proved problematic, so in 1904 George Whale began rebuilding these to simple expansion engines.  Fifteen were converted to Class C between 1904–1906, 62 to Class D between 1906–1909, with the remaining 34 rebuilt by Charles Bowen Cooke to Class C1 between 1909-1912.

All Class D locomotives were later rebuilt to Class G1. Some of them, rebuilt to Class G2a, were still running in 1962.

Classification
The LNWR letter classification system for 8 coupled engines (A, B, C, etc.) was introduced in 1911.

References

Further reading
 
 

A
0-8-0 locomotives
Compound locomotives
Railway locomotives introduced in 1893
Standard gauge steam locomotives of Great Britain
D n3v locomotives